DZAU (1233 AM) is a radio station owned and operated by Polytechnic Foundation of Cotabato and Asia. Its studios and transmitter are located at Heritage Homes, Brgy. Binanuan, Talisay, Camarines Norte.

References

Radio stations established in 2010
Radio stations in Camarines Norte